Several naval ships were named Helgoland after the island of Heligoland or the Battle of Helgoland, an action during the Second Schleswig War.

Germany
 , a Rickmers Line ship wrecked in 1863
 , a HAPAG steamship in service 1872–1879
 , a Hansa Line tug in service until 1928
 , a NDL steamship in service 1900–1914
 , a 23,000-ton , launched 1909
 , a HAPAG steamship in service until 1922
 , a NDL steamship in service 1936–1942
 , a HAPAG steamship in service until 1946
 , a whaler requisitioned by the Kriegsmarine during the Second World War
 MV Helgoland, a hospital ship used in the Vietnam War from 1966 to 1971

Austria-Hungary
 , a corvette
 , a

Denmark

German Navy ship names